George Holmes  is a British academic administrator. He has served as the vice-chancellor of the University of Bolton since 2006.

Life
Holmes was born to a property developer. He earned a BSc in Economics, a Master’s in Business Administration, and a Doctorate in Education.

Holmes was the Deputy Vice Chancellor at the University of North London, later known as London Metropolitan University. He later served as the principal of Doncaster College. Holmes has served as the vice-chancellor of the University of Bolton since 2006. He earned £202,500 in 2015 and £222,120 in 2016. Holmes is a fellow of the Institute of Directors. He attended the controversial male-only President's Club fundraiser in London in 2018, where women 'hostesses' were auctioned, and tried to claim this was a 'business meeting'.

In 2021, Holmes was awarded as Knight Commander of the Order of Saint Agatha by the Republic of San Marino, a recognition bestowed for charitable work in the service of the Republic.

Holmes owns two Bentleys and a yacht.

References

Living people
Academics of the University of North London
Academics of the University of Bolton
Year of birth missing (living people)